Andrés Esteban Reyes Santibáñez (born 26 September 1987) is a Chilean footballer who plays for Deportes Iberia in the Segunda División Profesional de Chile.

External links
 

Chilean footballers
1987 births
Living people
Magallanes footballers
Ñublense footballers
Rangers de Talca footballers
Deportes Magallanes footballers
Deportes Iberia footballers
Primera B de Chile players
Chilean Primera División players
Segunda División Profesional de Chile players
Place of birth missing (living people)
Association football defenders